Vijaypal Singh Sajwan is an Indian politician from Uttarakhand and a two term Member of the Uttarakhand Legislative Assembly. He is the Vice President of Uttarakhand Pradesh Congress Committee. He represented the Gangotri Assembly constituency in 1st & 3rd Uttarakhand Legislative Assembly Elections.

Positions held

Electoral Performances

References

External links
 

Living people
20th-century Indian politicians
Indian National Congress politicians from Uttarakhand
People from Uttarkashi district
1958 births